The 1993 Malaysian motorcycle Grand Prix was the second round of the 1993 Grand Prix motorcycle racing season. It took place on the weekend of 4 April 1993 at the Shah Alam Circuit.

500 cc race report
Kevin Schwantz got the second pole in a row, but got a bad start while Wayne Rainey got a good one, then it's Àlex Crivillé, Daryl Beattie and Mick Doohan. Rainey ran away with it on a hot day with Dunlops.

500 cc classification

250 cc classification

References

Malaysian motorcycle Grand Prix
Malaysian
Motorcycle Grand Prix